Bent Christensen may refer to:

 Bent Christensen (director), Danish film director
 Bent Christensen (footballer born 1963), Danish footballer who played four games for the Danish national team
 Bent Christensen Arensøe, formerly known as Bent René Christensen, (born 1967), Danish football player who won the 1992 European Championship